The Kungälv school shooting took place on 4 March 1961 in Kungälvs läroverk, in central Kungälv in Västra Götaland, Sweden. The school is currently known as Thorildskolan. It was the first reported school shooting in Sweden and one of the earliest in Europe. Seven youngsters were wounded by 15 bullets fired by the perpetrator and one died from his wounds.

The memory of the murdered Per Håkan Altvall is kept alive in Kungälv via a stipend "awarded annually to one or a number of students known for good friendship and social support to students".

Incident 
Around 11:30 p.m. on March 4, 1961, a large group of youngsters were dancing in the school gym hall. During the last dance, 17-year-old Ove Conry Andersson entered, pulled out a gun and started shooting randomly. People attempted to hide under chairs and behind a piano. Seven were wounded, including 18-year-old Per Håkan Altvall, who later died from his wounds. He was hit in the stomach and an eyewitness states that the perpetrator first shot Altvall in the leg and later on his way out shot him again in the stomach, killing him. The wounded were first taken to a classroom in the school and later to Kungälv hospital.

Kungälv police chased the gunman all night on the road to Ytterby, where it was assumed he had escaped. Kungälv police requested assistance from police in both Ytterby and Gothenburg. The following morning, March 5, just before 8 a.m., the killer showed up at the police station, driven there by an older coworker. A few hours later, the 17-year-old gunman had willingly told the police all his details of the incident. The shooter had been to a different party earlier and drank two mixed drinks, then watched an ice hockey game while drinking cognac with a friend. At 10.30 p.m. he first entered the school dance and got into a fight with a guest who was also an amateur boxer. Andersson then went to get his gun, came back and started shooting, killing Altvall before escaping and hiding in the Fontin forest. The chase for Andersson was the largest police activity in west Sweden to date, involving a total of 50 policemen plus dogs.  

On March 6, all of the school gathered in the gym hall in memory of Per Altvall.

Perpetrator
Andersson was known in Kungälv for his interest in cowboy movies and told the police he wanted to be like heroes in the movies. This event led to the first proposal to the government to investigate the effects of media violence, and the then-popular radio show "Tidsspegeln" (Mirror of Time) held a debate about "ideals and heroes for the youth" with the headline "Can we blame Cartwrights".

A 1995 article in Swedish newspaper Dagens Nyheter reported that Andersson was considered mentally unbalanced, partly because of the effects of alcohol, at the time of the shooting, and sentenced to closed psychiatric treatment. He refused to comment but DN mentioned that "it is known that he had married and had children less than four years after the incident." Altvall's mother Essie, then 88, was also interviewed and mentioned that she reached out to Andersson's mother shortly after the shooting and had forgiven the shooter for the murder of her son.

Andersson committed suicide on 12 August 2008.

See also
List of school-related attacks

References

School shootings committed by pupils
Deaths by firearm in Sweden
March 1961 events in Europe
1961 murders in Sweden
School shootings in Europe